Moss Run is an unincorporated community in Alleghany County, Virginia, United States.

References
GNIS reference
 

Unincorporated communities in Virginia
Unincorporated communities in Alleghany County, Virginia